The Attock Refinery Limited is a Pakistani petroleum company which is a subsidiary of UK-domiciled Attock Oil Company. It is active in crude oil refining in the country. The company is based in Rawalpindi, Punjab, Pakistan.

The company is listed on Pakistan Stock Exchange.

Refinery's petroleum products
Some of its major products include:
 Liquefied petroleum gas (LPG)
 Unleaded premium motor gasoline
 Mineral turpentine
 Kerosene oil
 High speed diesel
 Jet petroleum
 Petroleum solvents
 Light diesel oil
 Furnace fuel oil
 Paving grade asphalts

See also

 List of oil refineries
 Attock Group of Companies

References

External links
 Attock Refinery Limited
 

Companies listed on the Pakistan Stock Exchange
Oil and gas companies of Pakistan
Oil refineries in Pakistan
Pakistani subsidiaries of foreign companies
Indian companies established in 1922
Companies based in Rawalpindi
Energy companies established in 1922
Formerly government-owned companies of Pakistan